Claudio Fiorentini (11 October 1921 – 1 December 2014) was an Italian sports shooter. He competed in the 50 metre pistol event at the 1956 Summer Olympics. Fiorentini was also a five-time national champion in pistol shooting in the 1950s. He was awarded with three War Merit Crosses in the 1940s and the Order of Merit in 1957.

References

External links
 

1921 births
2014 deaths
Italian male sport shooters
Olympic shooters of Italy
Shooters at the 1956 Summer Olympics
Sportspeople from Verona
20th-century Italian people